Disco Romance is the debut studio album by Swedish electronic duo Sally Shapiro. It was released in Europe on 22 November 2006 by Diskokaine and in North America on 30 October 2007 by Paper Bag Records.

Track listing

Personnel
 Sally Shapiro – vocals
 Johan Agebjörn – producer, backing vocals (all tracks); mastering (track 5)
 Wolfram "marfloW" Eckert – executive producer
 Evelina Joëlson – backing vocals (track 5)
 Frida Klingberg – photography
 Patrick Pulsinger – mastering (tracks 1–4, 6–9)
 Q-Force – pre-mastering (track 5)
 Rude 66 – remix (track 9)
 SLL – mastering (track 5)

Additional personnel for the North American edition
 Anna Sanne Göransson – backing vocals (tracks 8, 9)
 Evelina Joëlson – backing vocals (tracks 5, 8, 9)
 Patrick Pulsinger – mastering (tracks 1–5, 7, 10)
 SLL – mastering (tracks 5, 6, 8, 9)

References

2006 debut albums
Paper Bag Records albums
Sally Shapiro albums